De Bernardi or de Bernardi may refer to:

Clothilde de Bernardi (born 1994), French tennis player
Fred DeBernardi (1949–2020), American football player
Jörg De Bernardi (born 1973), Swiss diplomat and politician
Mario de Bernardi (1893–1959), an Italian pilot
Piero De Bernardi (1926–2010), an Italian screenwriter

See also
Bernardi